SMS Orjen was one of six s built for the  (Austro-Hungarian Navy) shortly before the First World War. Completed in 1914, she helped to sink an Italian destroyer during the action off Vieste in May 1915 after Italy declared war on Austria-Hungary. Two months later the ship participated in an unsuccessful attempt to recapture a small island in the central Adriatic Sea from the Italians. In November and early December Orjen was one of the ships conducting raids off the Albanian coast to interdict the supply lines between Italy and Albania, although she did not participate in the First Battle of Durazzo in late December. Orjen participated in several raids on the Otranto Barrage in 1916–1917 with limited success. She was transferred to Italy in 1920 in accordance with the peace treaties ending the war and renamed Pola. She mostly served as a training ship or in Italian North Africa when she was not in reserve from 1924 to 1928. Renamed Zenson in 1931, the ship was scrapped in 1937.

Design and description
The Tátra-class destroyers were faster, more powerfully armed and more than twice as large as the preceding . The ships had a complement of 105 officers and enlisted men.

The Tátras were powered by two AEG-Curtiss steam turbine sets, each driving a single propeller shaft using steam provided by six Yarrow boilers. Four of the boilers were oil-fired while the remaining pair used coal.

The main armament of the Tátra-class destroyers consisted of two 50-caliber Škoda Works  K10 guns, one each fore and aft of the superstructure in single, unprotected mounts. Their secondary armament consisted of six 45-caliber  guns, two of which were on anti-aircraft mountings. They were also equipped with four  torpedo tubes in two twin rotating mountings amidships.

Construction and career
Orjen was laid down by Ganz-Danubius at their shipyard in Porto Ré in the Kingdom of Croatia-Slavonia of the Austro-Hungarian Empire on 4 September 1912, launched on 26 August 1913 and completed on 11 August 1914. The Tátra-class ships did not play a significant role in the minor raids and skirmishing in the Adriatic in 1914 and early 1915 between the Entente Cordiale and the Central Powers. From 9 to 24 December, Orjen had her propeller shaft bearings replaced in Pola.

Action off Vieste

The Kingdom of Italy signed a secret treaty in London in late April 1915 breaking its alliance with the German Empire and Austro-Hungary and promising to declare war on the Central Powers within a month. To warn of any Italian warships able to interfere with the bombardments, Haus prepositioned three groups of destroyers, each led by a scout cruiser. Placed in the central Adriatic between the island of Pelagosa and the Italian coast, four days prior to the Italian declaration of war on 23 May, were four Tátra-class destroyers, including Orjen, and the cruiser . Around midnight on the night of 23/24 May, Haus ordered the reconnaissance groups to move west and attack Italian coastal targets.

The Italian ships separated when Aquilone went to investigate a sighting; Helgoland began bombarding the city of Barletta at 04:00 and the Italian destroyer spotted the cruiser at 04:38. Aquilone turned away to the southeast and was able to disengage without any damage. Turbine, however, encountered Helgoland several minutes later and believed that she was an Italian ship until she was disabused by a salvo from the cruiser. The destroyer turned to the north, towards Vieste, to escape, with Helgoland and Orjen in pursuit. The destroyer , which had been bombarding Vieste, was ordered to block her escape to the north while Helgoland stayed to the east to cut off her access to the Adriatic. Lika scored the critical hit of the battle when one of her 66-millimeter shells broke Turbines steam pipe and caused her to rapidly lose speed. Tátra and Helgoland also scored hits and Turbine was dead in the water with a list when her crew abandoned ship at 06:51. She had hit Tátra and Csepel during the engagement, but failed to inflict any significant damage. The Austro-Hungarians rescued 35 survivors before torpedoing the derelict ship. As they were withdrawing they were engaged by the protected cruiser  and the armed merchant cruiser  between 07:10 and 07:19. Helgoland was struck by one shell before they were able to disengage from the slower ships.

On 28 July, all six Tátra-class ships and the scout cruisers  and Helgoland, reinforced by the German submarine , attempted to recapture Pelagosa which had been occupied by the Italians on 11 July. Despite a heavy bombardment by the ships, the 108-man landing party was unable to overcome the 90-man garrison and was forced to withdraw. Three weeks later, Saida, Helgoland, Orjen, Lika and two other destroyers bombarded the island, destroying its freshwater cistern, which forced the Italians to withdraw on 18 August.

The Bulgarian declaration of war on Serbia on 14 October cut the existing supply line from Serbia to Salonika, Greece, and forced the Allies to begin supplying Serbia through ports in Albania. This took about a month to work out the details and the Austro-Hungarians took just about as long to decide on a response. Haus ordered Seitz to take Helgoland, Saida and all six Tátra-class destroyers on a reconnaissance mission off the Albanian coast on the night of 22/23 November. They encountered and sank a small cargo ship and a motor schooner carrying flour for Serbia; four Italian destroyers were unable to intercept them before they reached friendly territory. On 6 December, Helgoland and the Tátras swept down the coast to Durazzo, sinking five motor schooners, including two in Durazzo harbor.

1916–1918

On 27 January 1916, Novara, Csepel and Orjen departed Cattaro on a mission to attack the shipping in Durazzo harbor. En route the two sisters accidentally collided with each other and had to return to port although the cruiser continued the mission. The impact bent Orjens bow and she was under repair until 16 February. The ship made unsuccessful sorties in search of Allied shipping on 23 and 26 February. On the night of 31 May/1 June 1916, Orjen and her sister , together with three torpedo boats, attacked the Otranto Barrage and sank one of the drifters maintaining it with a torpedo. On 4 July Helgoland, Orjen, Balaton and Tátra raided the barrage, but could not find any targets in the poor visibility. Orjen made another unsuccessful raid on the barrage on the night of 23/24 July. Helgoland and Novara, escorted by Orjen and Balaton, comprised one of two bombardment groups that Haus planned to bombard the Italian coast on 29 August to provoke a reaction by Allied ships that would be ambushed by waiting U-boats. The weather did not cooperate and it was too foggy to see the coast, and all the ships involved returned to harbor without incident. Orjen was refitted in Pola during 1–22 October and spent the rest of the year escorting convoys. On the night of 11/12 March 1917, Orjen, Balaton, Csepel and Tátra swept through the Strait of Otranto, but failed to sink the French cargo ship  that they encountered. From 30 March to 14 May, Orjen had two of her boilers replaced and returned to Cattaro on 17 May. She participated in the unsuccessful search for the missing flying boat K222 on 11 August.

The smaller ships in the Austro-Hungarian Navy were the most active ones and their crews had the highest morale; most of the larger ships did little but swing on their moorings which did nothing to improve the morale of their crews. On 1 February, the Cattaro Mutiny broke out, starting aboard the armored cruiser . The mutineers rapidly gained control of the armored cruiser  and most of the other major warships in the harbor. Unhappy with the failure of the smaller ships' crews to join the mutiny, the mutineers threatened to fire at any ship that failed to hoist a red flag. Orjens crew hoisted a flag with the permission of her captain with the proviso that there should be no disturbances aboard ship. The following day, many of the mutinous ships abandoned the effort after coast-defense guns loyal to the government opened fire on the rebel guard ship . The scout cruisers and Orjen, among other ships, took advantage of the confusion to rejoin loyalist forces in the inner harbor where they were protected by coastal artillery. The next morning, the s arrived from Pola and put down the uprising.

End of the war
By October it had become clear that Austria-Hungary was facing defeat in the war. With various attempts to quell nationalist sentiments failing, Emperor Karl I decided to sever Austria-Hungary's alliance with Germany and appeal to the Allies in an attempt to preserve the empire from complete collapse. On 26 October Austria-Hungary informed Germany that their alliance was over. At the same time, the Austro-Hungarian Navy was in the process of tearing itself apart along ethnic and nationalist lines. Vice Admiral Miklós Horthy was informed on the morning of 28 October that an armistice was imminent, and used this news to maintain order and prevent a mutiny among the fleet. While a mutiny was spared, tensions remained high and morale was at an all-time low.

The following day the National Council in Zagreb announced Croatia's dynastic ties to Hungary had come to an end. This new provisional government, while throwing off Hungarian rule, had not yet declared independence from Austria-Hungary. Thus Emperor Karl I's government in Vienna asked the newly formed State of Slovenes, Croats and Serbs for help maintaining the fleet stationed at Pola and keeping order among the navy. The National Council refused to assist unless the Austro-Hungarian Navy was first placed under its command. Emperor Karl I, still attempting to save the Empire from collapse, agreed to the transfer, provided that the other "nations" which made up Austria-Hungary would be able to claim their fair share of the value of the fleet at a later time. All sailors not of Slovene, Croatian, Bosnian, or Serbian background were placed on leave for the time being, while the officers were given the choice of joining the new navy or retiring.

The Austro-Hungarian government thus decided to hand over the bulk of its fleet, preferring to do that rather than give the fleet to the Allies, as the new state had declared its neutrality. Furthermore, the newly formed state had also not yet publicly repudiated Emperor Karl I, keeping the possibility of reforming the Empire into a triple monarchy alive.

Post-war
On 3 November the Austro-Hungarian government signed the Armistice of Villa Giusti with Italy, ending the fighting along the Italian Front, although it refused to recognize the transfer of Austria-Hungary's warships. As a result, on 4 November, Italian ships sailed into the ports of Trieste, Pola, and Fiume and Italian troops occupied the naval installations at Pola the following day. The National Council did not order any men to resist the Italians, but they also condemned Italy's actions as illegitimate. On 9 November, all remaining ships in Pola harbour had the Italian flag raised. At a conference at Corfu, the Allies agreed the transfer could not be accepted, despite sympathy from the United Kingdom. Faced with the prospect of being given an ultimatum to surrender the former Austro-Hungarian warships, the National Council agreed to hand over the ships beginning on 10 November.

When the Allies divided up the Austro-Hungarian Fleet amongst themselves in January 1920, Orjen was awarded to Italy. The ship was reduced to reserve in Taranto from 1924 to 1928 and was recommissioned for service in Libya in March 1928. Pola was reassigned to the Venetian squadron in 1929 before returning to Libya the following year. The ship was renamed Zenson on 9 April 1931 and cruised the Aegean Sea in 1931 and 1932. The ship was discarded on 1 May 1937 and subsequently scrapped.

Notes

Citations

Bibliography
 

 
 
 

Tátra-class destroyers
1913 ships